Irene née Dobbs Jackson was a professor of French at Spelman College and a civil rights activist who helped desegregate Atlanta's public libraries, where African American patrons were only allowed to read books in the basement. Maynard Jackson was her son. She went by "Renie".

She was from Atlanta's prominent Dobbs family. John Wesley Dobbs was her father. She had five sisters including opera singer Mattiwilda Dobbs and activist and civic leader Josephine Dobbs Clement.

She was valedictorian of her class at Spelman and studied French. She corresponded with Martin Luther King Jr. while studying in France. She earned a doctorate at the University of Toulouse in France.

African Americans were only allowed to use a segregated branch library. Jackson pressed for a library card at the main branch and received one. She taught at Spelman for almost 50 years.

She, like her mother, had six children. The Georgia House of Representatives passed a resolution commemorating her after her death in 1999.

In 2020, the redevelopment of the home she had with her husband was targeted for redevelopment as affordable housing for Atlanta University graduate students and researchers.

She was interviewed for the Civil Rights History Project.

References

External links
Findagrave entry

Spelman College faculty
Year of birth missing
1999 deaths
Spelman College alumni
University of Toulouse alumni
African-American activists
Activists from Atlanta